Majano is a town in Friuli. It could also refer to:
Valverde del Majano, a municipality located in the province of Segovia, Castile and León, Spain
Majano (genus), a sea anemone genus
Adolfo Arnoldo Majano (b. 1938), Salvadoran army officer and member of the provisional junta (1979–1980).
Anton Giulio Majano (1909–1994), an Italian screenwriter and film director
Maiano, locale in Fiesole, of which it is a variant spelling
Benedetto da Maiano (1442–1497), an Italian sculptor
Dante da Maiano, a late thirteenth-century poet